The Kongtong School is a martial arts school mentioned in several works of wuxia fiction. It is commonly featured as a leading orthodox school in the jianghu (martial artists' community). It is named after the place where it is based, the Kongtong Mountains.

History 
According to legend, the Kongtong School was founded by Mulingzi, who in his childhood had met an immortal in the Kongtong Mountains and learnt extraordinary martial arts. Mulingzi attained a remarkable level of prowess in martial arts and led Kongtong towards its rise to prominence in the jianghu as one of the major orthodox schools alongside Shaolin, Wudang, and others.

Mulingzi is known for his most powerful skill, the Seven Harms Fist, and his chivalry. Mulingzi hated villainy so he often roamed the jianghu in his younger days as a youxia to help the poor and punish the wicked. In his later years, Mulingzi still retained his fiery temper and strong aversion towards evil. Whenever he saw any Kongtong member engaging in an immoral act, he would severely punish that person. He was especially strict towards his own apprentices.

In The Heaven Sword and Dragon Saber, the Kongtong School is led by the Five Elders and it joins five other orthodox schools in a campaign against the Ming Cult, leading to the battle at Bright Peak. Xie Xun of the Ming Cult had stolen the Seven Harms Fist manual from Kongtong and mastered the skill. However, Zhang Wuji, the new leader of the Ming Cult, saves it from destruction at the hands of the six schools. Zhang also heals one of Kongtong's elders, Zong Weixia, during a fight, and inadvertently improves the cult's relations with Kongtong. Zong and some Kongtong members later appear to help Zhang Wuji rescue Xie Xun from Shaolin Monastery, even though Xie was previously an enemy of Kongtong.

Another account of Kongtong's origins states that the school was founded by Feihongzi, a former Shaolin monk who later became a recluse in the Kongtong Mountains.

Skills and martial arts 
Kongtong's martial arts bear some resemblance to those of Wudang and Kunlun, because they all have their roots in Taoism. Kongtong's main focus in martial arts are to improve physical fitness and increase inner energy strength. A unique feature of Kongtong is that its members do not use traditional martial arts weapons such as swords, sabers, and staffs. Instead, Kongtong has its own custom weapons that come in all forms and shapes, but nevertheless as deadly. The weapons' designs make them easily concealable and can be used as secret weapons during combat to achieve an edge over opponents. Some of Kongtong's best known skills include: Seven Harms Fist, Soaring Phoenix Hand, and Yin and Yang Grind.

See also 
 Kongtong Mountains

Notes 

Organizations in Wuxia fiction